Mary Hall  (1843–1927) was an American lawyer and philanthropist.

Mary Hall may also refer to:
Mary Lassells, married name Mary Hall, 16th-century accuser of Queen Catherine Howard
Mary Hall (actress), American stage actress
Mary Fields Hall (born 1934), American military nurse
Mary Ann Hall (died 1886), brothel keeper in Washington, D.C.

See also
Marie Hall (1884–1956), English violinist